Meliochamus homoeus is a species of beetle in the family Cerambycidae. It was described by Karl Jordan in 1903. It is known from Cameroon, Gabon, Rwanda, Equatorial Guinea, the Central African Republic, the Republic of the Congo, and the Democratic Republic of the Congo.

References

Lamiini
Beetles described in 1903